The Division of Lawson was an Australian Electoral Division in the state of New South Wales. It was located in the north-west of the state, and included the towns of Coonabarabran, Dubbo and Mudgee.

The Division was named for Federation era Australian author Henry Lawson. It was proclaimed at the redistribution of 11 May 1949, and was first contested at the 1949 federal election. It was abolished at the redistribution of 21 November 1968.

Members

Election results

References 

1949 establishments in Australia
Constituencies established in 1949
1969 disestablishments in Australia
Constituencies disestablished in 1969
Lawson